The Association for Research in Otolaryngology is a professional association of researchers, including practitioners, teachers, and students, in the fields of otolaryngology (ear, nose, and throat), and especially including hearing.

Journal

JARO (the Journal of the Association for Research in Otolaryngology) is an online-first peer-reviewed journal published by the ARO through Springer.

References

External links
 ARO official site

Otorhinolaryngology organizations